Funnybones (Sgerbyde in welsh) )is a British children's television comedy series, which originally aired on S4C in Wales, and on BBC One with BBC Two showing repeats elsewhere in the United Kingdom from 29 September to 15 December 1992.

It was based on the eponymous series of nine storybooks and one triple storybook, by Janet and Allan Ahlberg, which were illustrated by André Amstutz, and focused on the adventures of a pair of skeletons who were the eponymous Funnybones, Published in 1980. There was Big Funnybone (whose catchphrase was "good idea"), Little Funnybone (the brains of the group), (White, White) Dog ("These Bones") Funnybone (whose catchphrase was "Woof.") and (Black, Black) Cat (whose catchphrase was "Meow."). Each of the show's episodes was five minutes in length.

The English voices were provided by popular comedian Griff Rhys Jones, who also sang the theme song as the Moon Man whilst the Welsh voices were provided by Ray Gravel, who also sang the theme song as the Moon Man.

Main characters
 Big: The larger skeleton brother (who wore a mini red bowler hat in the TV series and who wore various hats in the storybooks and in his wishful ideas). He admitted "good idea" on every idea he approved of from Little.
 Little: The smaller skeleton brother (who was without a hat), but came up with many ideas for the crew to do in every episode.
 Dog: The pet dog of the skeleton brothers who loved bones, digging holes, and found everything that the skeleton brothers need.
 Cat: The pet black cat of the skeleton brothers, who always got chased by Dog. Unlike other characters, she was not a skeleton.
 Moon Man: The Crescent-moon-shaped character who was always the narrator in each episode. Unlike other characters, he was also not a skeleton. 
 Mr. Bonehead: The skeleton owner of the pet shop (who wore a bigger hat called a flat cap with a pencil and an apron), who Big and Little took Dog into with a view to swapping him for another pet etc. in the episode "The Pet Shop" and everything else in other episodes.
 Dr. Bones: The skeleton doctor (who wore a doctor's coat and glasses with a first aid kit, a stethoscope and a leg tapping hammer) who helped Big and Little to stop them from bumping in the night and everything else etc. in the episode "Bumps in the Night" and everything else in other episodes.

Episode guide via storybook comparison
On the television series of Funnybones, six episodes have the same title based on the storybooks, but three had different titles of storybooks based on the same episode, and the other three never had a storybook applicable to them, excepting one storybook has a three-story collection. The final episode of the television series, however, was based on the first storybook of Funnybones, while the first episode was based on the second storybook called "The Pet Shop". All twelve episodes were originally shown on BBC One and repeated on BBC Two as part of the Children's BBC strand, as it was known before 1999, on Tuesdays at 4:00pm.

A BBC video, entitled, Funnybones – Bumps in the Night (Cat. No. BBCV 4871), which contained all twelve episodes, was released soon after the series ended, but this is now out of print. The VHS tape was also released in Bulgaria and Australia, respectively by the companies Proxima Entertainment and ABC Video (but in the former case, it was dubbed into Bulgarian).

Miscellaneous
This was one of several cartoons dubbed by the then-new Irish post production company Telegael, to demonstrate children's programming possibilities for a proposed television station in Irish. The result, entitled Smior agus Smiortán (translated to the English language as Marrow & Little Marrow), was broadcast on Ireland's two national television stations, RTÉ1 and 2, in 1993.

The series also aired on ABC in Australia, from 1 February 1994 to 28 January 1999 as well as airing on the channel in Vanuatu and Papua New Guinea, SABC2 in South Africa, as part of a block for children called Mini-TV, the military television network BFBS in Germany and West Germany as well as being shown on the channel in Cyprus and Falkland Islands, Yle TV2 in Finland, TVNZ 2 in New Zealand and Cartoon Network, as part of a block for preschoolers called Small World and FOX Family Channel, as part of Mister Moose's Fun Time, a spinoff from The All New Captain Kangaroo in the United States.

References

External links
 Funnybones at Toonhound

1990s British animated television series
1990s British children's television series
1992 British television series debuts
1992 British television series endings
British children's animated comedy television series
English-language television shows
BBC children's television shows
S4C original programming
Fox Family Channel original programming
Australian Broadcasting Corporation original programming
British television shows based on children's books
Heinemann (publisher) books
Fictional skeletons